Classics in the Key of G is the first cover album and ninth studio album by saxophonist Kenny G. It was released by Arista Records on June 28, 1999, and reached number 1 on the Contemporary Jazz Albums chart, number 13 on the Internet Albums chart, number 17 on the Billboard 200 and number 27 on the R&B/Hip-Hop Albums chart.

Track listing 
 "Summertime" (featuring George Benson) (George Gershwin, Ira Gershwin) - 6:46
 "The Look of Love" (Burt Bacharach, Hal David) - 5:32
 "What a Wonderful World" (Lead vocal: Louis Armstrong) (George David Weiss, Robert Thiele) - 3:03
 "Desafinado" (Antonio Carlos Jobim, Newton Mendonça) - 5:52
 "In a Sentimental Mood" (Duke Ellington, Manny Kurtz, Irving Mills) - 4:56
 "The Girl from Ipanema" (Lead vocal: Bebel Gilberto) (Antonio Carlos Jobim, Norman Gimbel, Vinícius de Moraes) - 4:17
 "Stranger on the Shore" (Acker Bilk, Robert Mellin) - 3:09
 "Body and Soul" (Edward Heyman, Frank Eyton, Johnny Green, Robert Sour) - 7:20
 "'Round Midnight" (Bernie Hanighen, Cootie Williams, Thelonious Monk) - 6:26
 "Over the Rainbow/ The Girl from Ipanema (Instrumental)" (E.Y. "Yip" Harburg, Harold Arlen / Antonio Carlos Jobim, Norman Gimbel, Vinícius de Moraes) - 7:49

Personnel 
 Kenny G – soprano saxophone (1, 3, 5, 7, 9, 10), tenor saxophone (2, 4, 6, 8)
 Greg Phillinganes – Fender Rhodes (1, 2, 4, 5, 8, 9)
 Randy Waldman – acoustic piano (1, 2, 4, 5, 8, 9)
 David Foster – keyboards (3)
 Felipe Elgueta – synthesizers programming (3)
 Walter Afanasieff – keyboards (6, 7), synthesizers (6, 7), programming (6, 7), acoustic piano (10)
 Greg Bieck – additional keyboards (6), additional synthesizer (6), additional programming (6), programming (7)
 Adam Rossi – additional programming (7)
 George Benson – guitar (1), guitar intro (1)
 Nathan East – bass (1, 2, 4, 5, 8)
 Ricky Lawson – drums (1, 2, 4, 5, 8, 9)
 David Reitzas – drum programming (3)
 Paulinho da Costa – percussion (1, 2, 4, 5, 8, 9)
 Jeremy Lubbock – orchestration and conductor (1, 9)
 Jules Chakin – orchestra contractor (1, 9))
 William Ross – orchestration and conductor (2-8, 10)
 Patti Zimmitti – orchestra contractor (2-8, 10)

Production 
 Producers and Arrangements – Kenny G and Walter Afanasieff (tracks 1, 2, 4-10); David Foster (track 3).
 Recording Engineers – Humberto Gatica (tracks 1, 2, 4, 5, 7-10); David Reitzas (tracks 1 & 6); Felipe Elgueta (track 3); John Richards (track 6); David Gleeson (tracks 6 & 7); Steve Shepherd (track 7).
 Assistant Engineers – Mike Scotella (track 1); Christine Sirois (tracks 1, 2, 4, 5, 8 & 9); Andy Haller (tracks 1–5, 7-10); Mike Butler (tracks 1–5, 7-10); Cristian Robles (tracks 1–5, 7-10); Dann Thompson (tracks 1 & 9); Peter Doell (tracks 2–5, 7 & 10); Aaron Lepley (tracks 2 & 4); Chris Brook (track 3); Cristian Gonzalez (track 3); Ryan Hewitt (track 6); Pete Krawiec (track 6). 
 Additional Recording – David Gleeson (track 1); David Reitzas (tracks 2 & 4).
 Strings on track 3 recorded by Humberto Gatica
 Mastered by Vlado Meller at Sony Music Studios (New York, NY).
 Art Direction – Margery Greenspan
 Design – Jemal Pugh and Jeff Schultz
 Photography – Lyndie Benson and William Claxton
 Management – Dennis Turner at Turner Management Group, Inc.

Singles 
Information taken from this source.

Reception 

The third track features G's music overdubbed on Louis Armstrong's original recording. This move was criticized by musicians such as Pat Metheny and Richard Thompson, who were angered by what they perceived as arrogance on G's part to use a song by Louis Armstrong for personal gain.  Additionally, some versions of the insert booklet of the Arista CD contained an error attributing the writing of The Look of Love to Sammy Cahn and Jimmy Van Heusen, instead of Bacharach and David.

Certifications and sales

References 

1999 albums
Arista Records albums
Kenny G albums
Albums produced by David Foster
Albums produced by Walter Afanasieff